Óscar Guillermo Levín Coppel (born 4 September 1948) is a Mexican politician from the Institutional Revolutionary Party. He has served as Deputy of the LVIII and LXI Legislatures of the Mexican Congress representing Sinaloa.

References

1948 births
Living people
Politicians from Sinaloa
People from Mazatlán
Institutional Revolutionary Party politicians
21st-century Mexican politicians
National Autonomous University of Mexico alumni
Academic staff of the National Autonomous University of Mexico
20th-century Mexican politicians
Members of the Congress of Mexico City
Deputies of the LXI Legislature of Mexico
Members of the Chamber of Deputies (Mexico) for Sinaloa